Brachynomada is a genus of cuckoo bees in the family Apidae. There are about 17 described species in Brachynomada.

Species
These 17 species belong to the genus Brachynomada:

 Brachynomada annectens (Snelling & Rozen, 1987)
 Brachynomada argentina Holmberg, 1886
 Brachynomada bigibbosa (Friese, 1908)
 Brachynomada cearensis (Ducke, 1911)
 Brachynomada chacoensis Holmberg, 1886
 Brachynomada chica (Snelling & Rozen, 1987)
 Brachynomada grindeliae (Cockerell, 1903)
 Brachynomada margaretae (Rozen, 1994)
 Brachynomada melanantha (Linsley, 1939)
 Brachynomada nimia (Snelling & Rozen, 1987)
 Brachynomada roigella (Michener, 1996)
 Brachynomada roigi Rozen, 1994
 Brachynomada scotti Rozen, 1997
 Brachynomada sidaefloris (Cockerell, 1898)
 Brachynomada subminiata Cockerell
 Brachynomada thoracica (Friese, 1908)
 Brachynomada tomentifera (Ducke, 1907)

References

Further reading

External links

 

Nomadinae
Articles created by Qbugbot